The Africa-Italy Excellence Awards (AIEA), formerly known as Ghana-Italy Excellence Awards, is a cultural-diversity oriented award scheme aimed at celebrating exemplary African individuals for their significant difference in the African community in Italy and other European countries. The event brings to light notable Africans that have genuinely excelled in various spheres of life, hence contributing to the advancement of Africa from the diaspora. The Africa-Italy Excellence Awards is organized and powered by Divino Friends Organization.

Award Scheme 

Africa-Italy Excellence Awards (AIEA) was initially founded as Ghana-Italy Excellence Awards in 2008, with the maiden event organized in 2011 in Brescia, Italy. The maiden event was preceded by a similar event of such nature by the then Ghana Ambassador to Italy, H.E. Agyei Amoama, in 2007, after which it took on the brand name, "Ghana-Italy Excellence Awards", prior to the event in 2011. In the third occasion of the event in 2013, the award was re-branded to "Africa-Italy Excellence Awards" (AIEA) in order to extended the celebratory honour to other deserving African as well.  

The Africa-Italy Excellence Awards (AIEA) was officially endorsed in November 2013 by the European Parliament signed by President Martin Schulz, Roma Capitale, Brescia Municipality, and UNAR (National Office Against Racial Discrimination of the Presidency of the Council of Ministers). It has also been endorsed by His Excellency Mamadou Kamara Dékamo, Dean of the African Diplomatic Corps in Italy. The award does not only celebrates diversity, multiculturalism, and the achievements of the contemporary and historical African-Diaspora communities in Italy and Europe, but also pays tribute to the success of Africans across all walks of life, emphasizing achievement and highlighting inspirational role models in the fields of: Humanitarian, Arts and Culture, Business, Sports, and Entertainment. The AIEA seeks to address a broad spectrum of issues affecting the modern African.

How the Award Scheme Operates 

Each year, a committee responsible for reviewing the candidates for the AIEA is established and nomination of awardees are called for about 12 month prior to AIEA ceremony. The nominations are accepted based on an internal vetting process. The AIEA committee considers the activities of prospective nominees 12 months from date of nomination acceptance which makes up the first evaluation. A ballot by the committee is cast after which, the profile of qualified nominees are made public and also reviewed by an established Legal Affairs Committee composed of renowned experts in the fields of: Immigration, Economics and Social work. The Legal committee holds 55% of the votes and 45% is left with the general public.

Winners of the AIEA 

H.E. Christopher Norman Russell Prentice   
Prof. Mariano Pavanello
Hon. Giusi Nicolini
Dr Perviss Kwame Kuwornu
H.E. Eric Tonye Aworabhi
Edirissa Sanneh
Taiye Selasi
H.E. Hassan Abouyoub
Madi Sakande
Ray Foundation
H.E. Carla Elisa Mucav 
Kofi Osei Bonsu
Bretuoba Quaku Agyemang
Fabio Mandela
Thomas Andreaw
New Tecnowind Menssana Basket
Malu Mpasinkatu 
H.E. Evelyn Anita Strokes-Hayford
Dr. Kossi A. Komla-Ebri
Hon. Cècile Kashetu Kyenge
H.E. Mamadou Kamara Dekamo
Ottobre Africano 
Abdou Kader Alassane
Desiree Diao
E.A.Phography
Obed Duku 
Daniel Adomako, 
H.E. Nomatemba Tambo
Nana Yaw Badu Duku 
Aubrey Adofo Assiedu 
H.E. Mulgeta Alemseged Gessese
Harriet K. Mugera
Zuzanne M. Diku 
Jean Baptiseste Sourow
Martha Ahlijah Frimpong 
Samuel Kennedy Agyei Takyi
Reggie Tagoe
Stephen Ogongo 
Roland Agambre
Jean Leonard Touadi
Alima Moro
Victor Emeka Okeadu
Gloria Hooper
Fred Kojo Kuwornu
Jean Cloude Mbede

References

External links
 Africa Italy Excellence Awards Website

Award ceremonies
African diaspora in Italy